"The Middle of Starting Over" is a song recorded by American singer Sabrina Carpenter from her debut extended play Can't Blame a Girl for Trying (2014), serving as the second track of the EP. The track also appears on her debut studio album Eyes Wide Open (2015), serving as the third track of the record. The song was produced by Brian Malouf and written by Michelle Moyer, Jim McGorman with Robb Vallier, the last two being co-producers of the track. "The Middle of Starting Over" is a midtempo pop folk song with country pop influences backed by acoustic guitars and percussion elements. Lyrically, the song speaks about moving on, starting all over again and forgetting the mistakes. According to Carpenter, the song is about taking in life's mistakes and just finding fun ways to get through life. 

The song was released by Hollywood Records as the second single from Can't Blame a Girl for Trying on August 19, 2014 and was premiered a month before exclusively on Radio Disney. It was accompanied by a music video directed by The Young Astronauts premiered on her Vevo channel on September 21, 2014.

Background and recording
After the release of her debut single, Carpenter was choosing a second single to promote her EP, Can't Blame a Girl for Trying. In an interview with Teen.com, Carpenter said "The whole song is really just about taking in life's mistakes and just finding fun ways to get through life. Even if you are starting over, even if you do have to try new things, just make the best of it and have fun with it." The song was released as a single on August 19, 2015 and it had a radio impact on Radio Disney a month before. The song was also included on Carpenter's first studio album, Eyes Wide Open, which was released on April 14, 2015.

"The Middle of Starting Over" was written somewhere between 2013 and 2014 by Jim McGorman, Robb Vallier and Michelle Moyer. The song was produced by Brian Malouf and co-produced by McGorman and Vallier. Malouf mixed the track at Cookie Jar Recording, located in Sherman Oaks, California and Chris Thompson engineered the track. In the track, Malouf and McGorman played keyboards and Marc Slutsky play drums. McGorman also play acoustic guitar, electric guitar, bass and piano. Daniel Kalisher play mandolin while Vallier and Michelle contributed backing vocals to the track. The song was mastered by Eric Boulanger at The Mastering Lab, Inc., located in Ojai, California.

Composition and lyrical interpretation

Musically, "The Middle of Starting Over" is a three minutes and thirty-two seconds acoustic guitar-driven midtempo folk pop song with teen pop and country pop influences. In terms of music notation, "The Middle of Starting Over" was composed using  common time in the key of D major, with a lively, pushing forward tempo of 92 beats per minute. The song follows the chord progression of D–A/C-Bm-G and Carpenter's vocal range spans from the low note A3 to the high note of A4, giving the song one octave of range. Lyrically, the song speaks about moving on, starting all over again and forgetting the mistakes. According to Carpenter, the song talks about taking in life's mistakes and finding fun ways to get through life.

Music video

Background and release
On September 17, 2014, Radio Disney shared a teaser of the music video on their Instagram account. The music video was directed by The Young Astronauts and it was released on Vevo and YouTube on September 21, 2014. A lyric video was premiered on August 19, 2014 on YouTube and it features various scenes of her playing with her sister, Sarah Carpenter, with an inverse filter.

Synopsis
The music video begins with Carpenter walking with a guitar in her hand to a set with a ladder, a sofa, boxes and paint cans. Throughout the video is shown several scenes where Carpenter is in different backgrounds singing the song. At the first line of the song, Cast out of sea, Carpenter is shown standing on a piece of land. Throughout the music video are shown various fun scenes like pillow fights, balloons plays, changing scenarios, taking pictures and drawing and throwing flower petals. In all the sets, Carpenter and her music videos partners are having fun. The music video ends up with Carpenter walking out of the first set.

Critical reception

Anna Marie of A Kid's Point of You praised "The Middle of Starting Over" by saying "A folk-meets-pop jam, "The Middle of Starting Over" is certain to be added to countless sleepover playlists everywhere. It has an inspirational message and a unique, unforgettable sound only made stronger by Sabrina's powerful vocals. Dolph Malone of Headline Planet pointed "The Middle of Starting Over" and "Your Love's Like" as catchy and versatile songs for Carpenter's career. Malone said "Songs like "The Middle of Starting Over" and "Your Love's Like" feature punchier grooves, but they too function most prominently as platforms for Carpenter's unique artistry. They help to create variance in the sound without fostering a sense of dishonesty. They aid but do not define." The song received several comparisons with Taylor Swift's early works.

Live performances
Carpenter first performed the song at the 2014 Radio Disney Music Awards along with her debut single. A few time later, she performed at the Disney Social Media Moms Conference 2014. She performed the song at Fox&Friends Concert on New York in June 29  and in July 19 at the Children's Hospital Los Angeles Benefit Concert. She performed the song on Big Ticket Summer 2014  and she performed an acoustic version of the song on Perez TV along with "Can't Blame a Girl for Trying". She performed the song on Slimefest on 26 September  and in November at the Macy's Thanksgiving Day Parade 2014. In 2015, she performed the song at D23 Expo in 2015 along with "Take on the World", "We'll Be the Stars", a cover of "FourFiveSeconds", "Can't Bame a Girl for Trying" and "Eyes Wide Open".

Credits and personnel
Recording and management
Mixed at Cookie Jar Recording (Sherman Oaks, California)
Mastered at The Mastering Lab, Inc. (Ojai, California)
Val Derringer Music (ASCAP), Little Cyclone Music (ASCAP), Moyer Publishing (ASCAP)

Personnel

Sabrina Carpenter – lead vocals
Jim McGorman – songwriting, co-production, acoustic guitar, electric guitar, bass, piano, keyboards
Robb Vallier – songwriting, co-production, backing vocals
Michelle Moyer – songwriting, backing vocals
Brian Malouf – production, mixing, keyboards
Chris Thompson – engineering
Marc Slutsky – drums
Daniel Kalisher – mandolin
Eric Boulanger – mastering

Credits adapted from Eyes Wide Open liner notes.

Release history

References

2014 singles
2014 songs
Sabrina Carpenter songs
Hollywood Records singles
American folk rock songs